Sachchidananda Mishra (born March 1, 1971) is a Varanasi-based Sanskrit scholar. He is a professor of Philosophy and Religion at the Benares Hindu University. He was awarded the Maharshi Badrayan Vyas Award for Sanskrit for the year 2009 by Pratibha Patil, the then President of India. He specializes in Indian philosophy and Sanskrit grammar.

Work
Mishra has edited and authored seven books, which include:
 Vedāntasāra of Sadānanda with the Bālabodhinī commentary of Āpadeva and the Bālavyutpattivardhinī Hindi commentary
 Mānasollāsa with the Mānasollāsavardhinī commentary by Ānanda Kṛṣṇa Śāstrī
 Nyāyadarśana Meṃ Anumāna 
 Tattvacintāmaṇiprabhā
 Vyutpattivāda with a detailed introductory commentary in Hindi

References

1971 births
Living people
Indian Sanskrit scholars